Chaudhry Abdul Aziz (born 9 September 1971) is a Pakistani jurist who has been Justice of the Lahore High Court since 26 November 2016.

Judicial career
Aziz was inducted into Lahore High Court (LHC) as an additional justice on 26 November 2016. He became permanent Justice of the LHC on 22 October 2018.

References

1971 births
Living people
Judges of the Lahore High Court
Pakistani judges
Place of birth missing (living people)